Wayra Wasi (Quechua wayra wind, wasi house, "wind house", also spelled Huayra Huasi) is a  mountain in the Bolivian Andes. It is located in the Potosí Department, Tomás Frías Province, at the border of the Potosí Municipality and the Yocalla Municipality, west of the village of Tarapaya.

References 

Mountains of Potosí Department